Michael Davonta Thomas (born August 16, 1994) is an American football wide receiver for the Baltimore Ravens of the National Football League (NFL). He played college football at Southern Miss and was drafted by the Los Angeles Rams in the sixth round of the 2016 NFL Draft.

Early years
Thomas attended DuSable High School in Chicago, Illinois, where he led the Panthers football team to the state playoffs in 2010.

College career
Thomas started his collegiate career at College of DuPage in Glen Ellyn, Illinois in 2012, he transferred to Dodge City Community College in Kansas in 2013. He signed with the University of Southern Mississippi after the season. Thomas played at Southern Mississippi from 2014 to 2016.

Professional career

Los Angeles Rams
The Los Angeles Rams selected Thomas in the sixth round with the 206th overall pick in the 2016 NFL Draft. He was the 25th wide receiver selected. On June 9, 2016, the Rams signed Thomas to a four-year contract along with other Rams rookies. He finished his rookie season with just three receptions for 37 yards.

On July 14, 2017, Thomas was suspended the first four games of 2017 for violating the league’s policy on performance-enhancing drugs.

On September 17, 2018, Thomas was placed on injured reserve after suffering a groin injury in Week 1. Without Thomas, the Rams reached Super Bowl LIII where they lost 13-3 to the New England Patriots.

Cincinnati Bengals
On March 24, 2020, Thomas signed with the Cincinnati Bengals. In Week 2 of the 2020 season, Thomas caught his first professional touchdown on a four-yard pass from Joe Burrow in the 30–35 loss to the Cleveland Browns.

On March 26, 2021, Thomas re-signed with the Bengals on a one-year contract.

Thomas re-signed with the Bengals on a one-year contract on March 18, 2022. He was waived on November 21, 2022.

Baltimore Ravens
On December 20, 2022, Thomas signed with the practice squad of the Baltimore Ravens. He signed a reserve/future contract on January 16, 2023.

References

External links
Cincinnati Bengals bio
 Los Angeles Rams bio
 Southern Miss Golden Eagles bio

1994 births
Living people
American football wide receivers
Baltimore Ravens players
Cincinnati Bengals players
Los Angeles Rams players
Players of American football from Chicago
Southern Miss Golden Eagles football players